Golden snapper is a common name for a number of fish:

 Genus Centroberyx
Centroberyx affinis
 Genus Pagrus
Pagrus auratus
 Genus Lutjanus
Lutjanus inermis
Lutjanus johnii
Lutjanus mizenkoi
 Genus Pristipomoides 
Pristipomoides multidens